Journey to the Centre of the Earth is the second album by English keyboardist Rick Wakeman, released on 3 May 1974 by A&M Records. It is a live recording of the second of his two concerts at the Royal Festival Hall on 18 January 1974, the premiere of his 40-minute orchestral rock piece based on Jules Verne's 1864 science fiction novel of the same name. It tells the story of Professor Lidinbrook, his nephew Axel, and their guide Hans, who follow a passage to the Earth's centre originally discovered by Arne Saknussemm, an Icelandic alchemist. Wakeman performs with the London Symphony Orchestra, the English Chamber Choir, and a group of hand-picked musicians for his rock band, which later became the English Rock Ensemble. Actor David Hemmings narrates the story.

Journey to the Centre of the Earth was overall well received by music critics. It reached No. 1 on the UK Albums Chart, and peaked at No. 3 on the Billboard 200 in the United States. It was certified gold by the Recording Industry Association of America in October 1974 for selling 500,000 copies. The album earned Wakeman a nomination for an Ivor Novello Award and a Grammy Award for Best Pop Instrumental Performance. In 1999, Wakeman released a sequel album Return to the Centre of the Earth. After the original score was presumed lost, Wakeman was reunited with it in 2009 and re-recorded the album three years later with 18 minutes of music previously cut due to time constraints.

Background
By mid-1973, Wakeman had been with the progressive rock band Yes for almost two years, and he had released his debut solo effort, The Six Wives of Henry VIII. For his next release Wakeman wished to make an album that told a story with its music, something that he had been inspired to do so since his father took him to see a performance of the symphonic fairy tale Peter and the Wolf by Sergei Prokofiev which features a narrator telling the story and an orchestra illustrating the action. Wakeman had wanted to do an orchestral rock piece based on the 1864 science fiction novel A Journey to the Centre of the Earth by Jules Verne as early as November 1971, but he put the project on hold until he had finished recording The Six Wives of Henry VIII in October 1972, and had accumulated some money and had written some music for it.

The project developed in December 1972 when Wakeman took part in the orchestral concerts of The Who's rock opera Tommy at the Rainbow Theatre in London, which featured the London Symphony Orchestra, the English Chamber Choir, conductor David Measham, and musical arranger Wil Malone. Wakeman told his idea for Journey to the Centre of the Earth to the show's producer Lou Reizner, who put him in contact with Measham to further discuss plans. Wakeman then produced a demo tape that contained a rough outline of the overall structure of the music using a Minimoog synthesiser, Mellotron, Rhodes piano and clavinet and presented it to Measham, indicating where the orchestral parts were to be placed. After Measham agreed to be involved, Wakeman met with his manager Brian Lane to pitch the idea of performing it with an orchestra, choir, and a rock band. As the cost of recording the album in a studio was too high, Wakeman's label A&M Records agreed to have the work recorded live in concert. To help finance the project, Wakeman sold several of his cars and "mortgaged himself up to the hilt" to cover the estimated £40,000 in costs.

After the album received the green-light from A&M Records, Wakeman worked on the music "on and off" through 1973 and had assistance with the orchestral and choir arrangements with Malone and Danny Beckerman; the latter first met Wakeman during a Yes tour of Australia. A typical session had Malone devising chords and melody lines while Beckerman wrote the parts out on a score, which took several hours. It was Malone's first attempt at writing for a symphony orchestra; he had not received classical training. The original score lasted 55 minutes but it was reduced to 40 so it could fit the time constraints of an LP. Malone called the project a challenge and "completely different" to what he had been involved with previously.

A&M Records had wanted Wakeman to select a group of known musicians to play in his rock band, but he was opposed to the idea as he intended for the public to like the album for its music rather than the performers. Wakeman chose a group that he used to play with at the Valiant Trooper, a pub in Holmer Green in Buckinghamshire. "I'd played with them for fun quite a bit on Sunday evenings...I was playing keyboards with the lads when I thought, they could play Journey for me. I'm sure they could do the concert and do it well". He picked vocalists Ashley Holt of Warhorse and Gary Pickford-Hopkins from Wild Turkey, drummer Barney James, also of Warhorse, bassist Roger Newell, and guitarist Mike Egan, who had also played on The Six Wives of Henry VIII. The first bassist picked was Dave Wintour, also a performer on Six Wives. Actor and singer Richard Harris was the first choice to narrate the story but he was unavailable, so Wakeman picked actor David Hemmings.

Composition
The 40-minute piece is in four distinct sections: "The Journey", "Recollection", "The Battle", and "The Forest". Wakeman wrote all the lyrics and narration. Wakeman was not confident with his lyric writing, and admitted that his first set of lyrics were "really bad" which prompted a rewrite. His band nicknamed him "Longfellow". "The Forest" includes an excerpt of In the Hall of the Mountain King by Edvard Grieg.

Story

German Professor Lidinbrook discovers an old parchment that detailed a journey to the centre of Earth undertaken by Arne Saknussemm, an Icelandic alchemist. The parchment, when decoded into Latin and translated by Lidinbrook's nephew Axel, reveals an entrance to the route in the extinct volcano of Snæfellsjökull in Iceland. The pair embark on their journey with their guide Hans.

Upon entering the volcano they pass a lava gallery and find themselves in an intersection of two paths. Lidinbrook chooses the eastern tunnel, but after three days it had taken the trio to a dead end. They returned with just one day's supply of water, reaching the intersection weak and tired. After sleep, they continued their journey and Hans hears flowing water behind a wall of rock and attacks it with a pick axe, revealing a stream of boiling water they named the Hansbach.

The three temporarily separate, and a lone Axel becomes increasingly frightened. Thinking of those left at home, he cries and runs through a tunnel blindly. He almost gives up, then hears Lidinbrook's voice in the distance; he calculates he is just four miles apart, and sets off to reunite. At one point the ground beneath Axel collapses and he finds himself with Lidinbrook and Hans in a giant mushroom forest nearby cliffs and sea.

The trio build a raft and set sail for a port they named after Axel's fiancée, Port Grauben. Five days into their sail, they witness a battle between an ichthyosaurus and a plesiosaurus. The ichthyosaurus wins, and the travellers are hit with a four-day storm and take shelter by some overhanging rocks. The storm had caused them to travel only some miles north of Port Grauben, so they set out on land to track Saknussem's original route once more. They cross a plain of bones and into a forest inhabited by giant mastodons led by a  Proteus, a mythological human. Stunned, the three flee the forest for the Lidinbrook Sea and enter a dark tunnel that plunged deep into rock which they blast through with dynamite. The explosion causes an earthquake, and they become trapped in an active volcano shaft which projects them to the surface of the Earth by Mount Etna in Sicily.

Production

Concerts

The concerts and album were first announced in October 1973, and organised during a break when Yes were touring Tales from Topographic Oceans. Rehearsals began in December at Farmyard Studios in Little Chalfont, owned by Trevor Morais, with the band only before full scale rehearsals with the orchestra from 5 January 1974. On the day of the concert, further rehearsals began at 9 a.m. Two sell-out performances were held at 6 and 8 p.m. on Friday 18 January 1974 at the Royal Festival Hall in London, attended by 3,000 people each. Each performance lasted for one hour and forty minutes. Performing with Wakeman and his band were the London Symphony Orchestra and the English Chamber Choir conducted by Measham. A projection screen was placed above the stage, initially to display stock footage of mountains and caves, but permission was granted from 20th Century Fox to show excerpts from the 1959 adventure film of the same name to accompany the music. An initial plan was to have the concerts filmed for a prospective home video release when it was "commercially viable", but it did not come into fruition.

The shows were introduced with an excerpt of the final movement of Symphony No. 1 by Sergei Rachmaninoff. The first half was taken up by "Catherine Parr", "Catherine Howard", and "Anne Boleyn" from The Six Wives of Henry VIII, with comical pieces "A Road to Ruin" and a comical rendition of "Twelfth Street Rag" with banjos, minstrel dancers, and accompanying footage of Laurel and Hardy and various silent films. Wakeman thought the segment would be a disaster as the film arrived at the venue shortly before the first performance and resorted to improvising on the piano without knowing what the footage was. Wakeman wanted the first half to be "musical and entertaining" and a way of easing Journey to the audience, which made up the second half of the program. The encore was "The Pearl and Dean Piano Concerto", a humorous piece based on various television and film music. News reporter Chris Welch attended the shows and noted: "Several members of the choir could be seen jiving during the more rhythmic moments, and when Rick played some beautiful classical piano, approving nods could be detected from the massed ranks of the orchestra". A party was held after the second show which Wakeman did not attend due to exhaustion. According to Welch, "He was driven home – asleep".

Post-production
Wakeman had hoped to record both concerts and select the best performance of the two, but the London Symphony Orchestra requested double pay if this went ahead. He then took "the frightening decision of only recording the second performance and hoping there weren't too many mistakes". The performance was recorded using Ronnie Lane's Mobile Studio which housed a 16-track studio fitted in an Airstream trailer. The first half of the second show was recorded, initially as a test to see if the equipment worked correctly. It remained unreleased until 2002 as part of Wakeman's limited edition box set Treasure Chest.

The recordings were produced by Wakeman, and mixed by him and engineer Paul Tregurtha at Morgan Studios in London from 21 to 29 January 1974. They encountered a number of problems during this time. Wakeman said: "Someone in the street had accidentally kicked out the vocal mike cable just before we started recording. So we boosted up the vocals that were picked up on the other mikes". A snare drum and its microphone broke during the performance, and Hemmings re-recorded some narration in the studio after a tape change occurred during one of his passages. There were four bars of "complete shambles" between the orchestra and the band, so an identical passage that occurred later in the performance was inserted.

The original plan was for A&M Records to produce the album quickly for a February 1974 release, but the additional time required to fix the recordings and a shortage of vinyl at the time caused the label to push the release to early April. This sparked concern from management for potential bootleg recordings of the concert to be sold to the public. A&M reported that a later release would "tie in more conveniently with Wakeman's plans" as he had resumed touring with Yes during this time. Wakeman heard cuts of the album during the subsequent Yes tour, rejecting several of them. "I just didn't like the sound, and it was worth doing it properly for the sake of a few extra days". Another factor in the delay was a paper shortage as the original album design consisted of a gatefold sleeve with an 8-page booklet, but the designer refused to reduce the package to a standard sleeve.

Release
Upon its arrival at A&M Records, the finished album was poorly received among management; they refused to sell it. However, as Wakeman was under contract with A&M in the United States, a cassette was sent to co-founder Jerry Moss in California, who subsequently agreed to release the record. According to Wakeman, the album received 50,000 advanced orders.

Released on 3 May 1974, Journey to the Centre of the Earth topped the UK Albums Chart for one week. It peaked at No. 3 on the US Billboard 200 chart for two weeks in July during a stay of 27 weeks. The album became a multimillion-dollar seller in six weeks. Wakeman was nominated for an Ivor Novello Award for the album, and it earned him a Grammy Award nomination for Best Pop Instrumental Performance. The record was certified gold by the Recording Industry Association of America in September 1974. It was the first A&M title released in the four-channel Quadradisc CD-4 format. The album has sold 14 million copies worldwide.

In 1999, marking the album's 25th anniversary, Wakeman released a sequel titled Return to the Centre of the Earth. The story follows a group of adventurers who attempt to follow the previous expedition to the Earth's centre as discovered by Saknussemm.

In 2002, Wakeman released the 8-CD compilation box set Treasure Chest which contained the previously unreleased first half of the second concert at the Royal Festival Hall. The recording was presumed to have been wiped, but a rough mix was accidentally discovered on a poorly conditioned and mislabelled tape initially used as a guide for the mastering, and was digitally remastered. The CD also contained Hemmings record narration in five dialects during a recording session when he and Wakeman had been drinking while the album was being mixed.

In May 2016, a 3 CD+DVD Super Deluxe Edition box set was released containing a new remaster of the original album, live performances from 1974 and 1993, and a DVD-Audio with a Quad surround sound mix and Mobile Fidelity Sound Lab mix.

Reception
The album received some negative reaction upon its release, with music critics having described the record as a "classical pastiche...genuinely appalling" and "brutal synthesiser overkill". Journey however, was well received by others. A journalist for The Sunday Times missed the Royal Festival Hall concert, but thought on record the music "comes over magnificently ... a striking work which only occasionally lapses into pretentiousness". Music journalist Chris Welch of Melody Maker thought the album was "entertaining, fresh and disalarmingly unpretentious ... This could be a score for a Hollywood musical – tuneful, but with epic overtones". Welch noted Wakeman's "familiarity of the story" and his "close observance to detail engenders a warmth to the work, which made it a resounding success as a concert performance". In a retrospective review, Mike DeGange of Allmusic called the album "one of progressive rock's crowning achievements" and noted "interesting conglomerations of orchestral and synthesized music".

Tour
In July 1974, Wakeman headlined the Crystal Palace Garden Party concert, performing the album in its entirety with selections from The Six Wives of Henry VIII. Wakeman decided to use the small lake in front of Crystal Palace Bowl as part of the show; balloon versions of the dinosaurs were built to act out the album's climactic fight. When deployed, rising from the water, they failed to fully inflate, collapsed into each other and got stuck in front of the stage. The audience, many under the influence of hallucinogens, jumped into the lake to join them.

The morning of that show, Wakeman had lost consciousness and collapsed in his home, suffering several bruises. He attributed it to the fatigue of preparing for the show. During the performance, he suffered lightheadedness and felt as if he were floating. The next morning, with the band at his house making preparations to take the show on a world tour, Wakeman was on the phone with a journalist when he again fell to the floor, this time regaining consciousness, but suddenly feeling very sick. He was taken to hospital where doctors determined that he had suffered a heart attack, perhaps his third in the last 24 hours. Due to his relative youth at the time, it was attributed to the stress of touring combined with Wakeman's heavy smoking and drinking. Advised to remain in hospital for nine months and possibly retire, at least from touring, Wakeman instead went ahead with his tour plans.

The tour, his debut tour as a solo artist, started with a North American leg in September and October 1974. He was joined by his band, the English Rock Ensemble, formed of drummer Barney James, guitarist Jeffrey Crampton, vocalists Ashley Holt and Gary Pickford-Hopkins, bassist Roger Newell, and percussionist John Hodgson. Each show saw the group performing with the 45-piece National Philharmonic Orchestra and the 16-piece Choir of America, both formed of freelance musicians based in New York City, conducted by Measham with Terry Taplin as narrator. Under doctors orders, Wakeman was required to pass a heart monitor test prior to each show. The tour visited Japan, Australia, and New Zealand between January and March 1975.

2012 re-recording and performances

After the album's original tour, the conductor's score was placed into storage by his management company, MAM Records. After the label folded in the early 1980s, he recalled that no one had knowledge of its location and declined offers from promoters to stage concerts as he thought a rewrite of the score would not live up to the quality of the original. However, in 2009, a box from Australia arrived at Wakeman's house which stayed in his garage for about five months before he looked through it, finding nothing that belonged to him except a copy of the original score which by then had suffered from water damage. In the course of a year, the score was digitised and pieced together with assistance from conductor and arranger Guy Protheroe which Wakeman used to make a new studio re-recording of Journey to the Centre of the Earth with 18 minutes of music that was cut from the original piece due to time constraints on a vinyl added in, making a new 54-minute piece. Recording took place from July to September 2012 with the Orion Orchestra, the English Chamber Choir, and his rock band, the English Rock Ensemble. As Hemmings died in 2003, the narration is voiced by actor Peter Egan. Released on 20 November 2012, the album was packaged with a one-off magazine published by Classic Rock and a replica of the 1974 Royal Festival Hall concert program and a 132-page booklet. Wakeman toured the new arrangement with a UK tour from 24 April to 10 May 2014.

In celebration of the album's 45th anniversary and Wakeman's 70th birthday, Wakeman performed the re-recorded version at the Royal Festival Hall on 13 and 14 July 2019. In February 2023, Wakeman performed two shows at the London Palladium, the second of which included a performance of Journey to the Centre of the Earth.

Track listing

Original LP

2012 re-recording

Personnel
Credits adapted from the album's 1974 liner notes.

Musicians
Rick Wakeman – 3 Mellotrons, 2 Minimoog synthesisers, grand piano, Hammond organ, Rhodes electric piano, RMI electric piano, Hohner clavinet, Honky-tonk piano
 Gary Pickford-Hopkins – vocals
 Ashley Holt – vocals
 Mike Egan – electric guitar
 Roger Newell – bass guitar
 Barney James – drums
 David Hemmings – narration
 David Measham – conductor
 London Symphony Orchestra
 English Chamber Choir

Production
 Danny Beckerman – arrangements
 Will Malone – arrangements
 Pete Flanagan – engineer
 Keith Grant – production engineer
 Lou Reizner – production co-ordination
 Paul Tregurtha – engineer
 Michael Doud – original art direction
 Michael Wade – original design
 Chris Foster – photographer
 Paul Wakefield – photographer
 Peter Waldman – photographer
 Nigel Messett – photographer
 Ken Randall – photographer

Charts

Weekly charts

Year-end charts

Certifications

Accolades

References
Citations

Sources

Science fiction concept albums
Rick Wakeman albums
Works based on Journey to the Center of the Earth
1974 live albums
A&M Records live albums
David Hemmings albums
Music based on novels
Music based on science fiction works
Travel to the Earth's center
Music based on works by Jules Verne